is a railway station in Matsumoto, Nagano, Japan, operated by the private railway operating company Alpico Kōtsū.

Lines
Shinshimashima Station is the terminus of the Kamikōchi Line and is 14.4 kilometers from the opposing terminus of the line at Matsumoto Station.

Station layout
The station has one dead-headed island platform serving two tracks. The platforms are not numbered

Platforms

Adjacent stations

History
It was renamed to its present name on 1 October 1966. Due to damaged caused by the 1983 Typhoon 10, the line pass Shinshimashima Station was discontinued and replaced by a bus service, making this station the effective terminus of the line. A new station building was completed in 2002.

Passenger statistics
In fiscal 2016, the station was used by an average of 201 passengers daily (boarding passengers only).

Surrounding area
Azusa River

See also
 List of railway stations in Japan

References

External links

 

Railway stations in Japan opened in 1924
Railway stations in Matsumoto City
Kamikōchi Line